Romano Sgheiz (born 28 June 1937) is an Italian competition rower and Olympic champion.

Sgheiz was born in Colico, Italy, in 1937. Luciano Sgheiz (born 1941) is his brother.

At the 1956 European Rowing Championships, he won a bronze medal with the coxed four. Later that year, he received a gold medal in coxed four at the 1956 Summer Olympics in Melbourne, together with Alberto Winkler, Angelo Vanzin, Franco Trincavelli and Ivo Stefanoni. At the 1957 European Rowing Championships, he won a gold medal with the eight. In the following year, he regained the European championship title with the eight.

He received a bronze medal in the coxed four at the 1960 Summer Olympics in Rome. At the 1961 European Rowing Championships, he won yet another gold medal with the eight. At the 1963 European Rowing Championships, he won a silver medal with the coxless four. At the 1964 European Rowing Championships, he won a bronze medal with the coxless four. The same team came fifth at the 1964 Summer Olympics in the coxless four competition. Sgheiz retired after the 1964 Olympics but returned to competitive rowing for the 1968 Summer Olympics, where he gained a fourth place with the coxless four.

References

External links

1937 births
Living people
Italian male rowers
Olympic rowers of Italy
Olympic gold medalists for Italy
Olympic bronze medalists for Italy
Rowers at the 1956 Summer Olympics
Rowers at the 1960 Summer Olympics
Rowers at the 1964 Summer Olympics
Rowers at the 1968 Summer Olympics
Olympic medalists in rowing
Medalists at the 1960 Summer Olympics
Medalists at the 1956 Summer Olympics
People from Colico
European Rowing Championships medalists
Sportspeople from the Province of Lecco